Rosa Koian is a human rights and environmentalism activist from Papua New Guinea.

Life
Koian is a leading member of the Bismarck Ramu Group, a non-governmental organisation based in Madang Province, Papua New Guinea. The group represents indigenous communities on development and conservation issues. The group leads legal challenges against the advances of international corporations, particularly in resource extraction industries and palm oil production.

Koian also works with sufferers of leprosy to assist them to lead active lives and advocates for their needs.

Koian worked with the Oakland Institute on a film On Our Land, which was released in 2013 and described the rapid and massive appropriation of Papua New Guinean land by foreign-owned corporations.

Publications 

 'Social and economic impact of climate change in Papua New Guinea'. Catalyst, Vol. 42, No. 1, 2012: 69-83.

References

Living people
People from Madang Province
Year of birth missing (living people)
Papua New Guinean environmentalists
Papua New Guinean women environmentalists